
The following is a list of Playboy Playmates of 2018. Playboy magazine names their Playmate of the Month each month throughout the year.

January

Kayla Garvin is the Playboy Playmate of the Month for January 2018 and her pictorial was shot by Dove Shore.

February

Megan Samperi is the Playboy Playmate of the Month for February 2018 and her pictorial was shot by Christopher von Steinbach.

March

Jenny Watwood is the Playboy Playmate of the Month for March 2018 and her pictorial was shot by Derek Kettela.

April

Nereyda Bird is a Dominican-American model, and the Playboy Playmate of the Month for April 2018. Her Playmate of the Month pictorial was shot by Vanessa Hollander and Wilson Philippe. She was born in New York City, grew up in Philadelphia, and at the time of her pictorial, was residing in Miami, Florida. She began modeling at the age of 17, and co-owns a north Miami café with her mother called Grab & Go that serves authentic Dominican food.

Bird is represented by Wilhelmina Models.

A self-described tomboy, Bird enjoys drawing, and is a fan of comic books such as Tank Girl. She has said that if she had not become a model she would have been a comic book artist, and she also enjoys yoga, baking and attending arts festivals.

May

Shauna Sexton is the Playboy Playmate of the Month for May 2018 and her pictorial was shot by Dove Shore.

June

Cassandra Dawn is the Playboy Playmate of the Month for June 2018 and her pictorial was shot by Kyle Deleu.

July

Valeria Lakhina is the Playboy Playmate of the Month for July 2018 and her pictorial was shot by Ana Dias.

August

Lorena Medina is the Playboy Playmate of the Month for August 2018 and her pictorial was shot by Christopher von Steinbach.

September

Kirby Griffin is the Playboy Playmate of the Month for September 2018 and her pictorial was shot by Ali Mitton.

Griffin was discovered in Miami Beach while vacationing. She joined IMG Models in New York City and has appeared in a multitude of advertising campaigns throughout magazines, billboards, storefronts, websites, music videos, and television commercials around the world.

In 2012, Griffin appeared in the Sports Illustrated Swimsuit Issue.

October

 Olga De Mar is the Playboy Playmate of the Month for October 2018 and her pictorial was shot by Ana Dias.

November
 
 Shelby Rose is the Playboy Playmate of the Month for November 2018 and her pictorial was shot by Kyle Deleu.

December

 
Jordan Emanuel is the Playboy Playmate of the Month for December 2018 and her pictorial was shot by Dove Shore.

See also
 List of people in Playboy 2010–2019

References 

 2018
Playmates of 2018
2018-related lists